Trimeria may refer to:
 Trimeria (wasp), a genus of wasps in the family Vespidae
 Trimeria (plant), a genus of plants in the family Salicaceae